Vanilla sugar (German: Vanillezucker, Polish: Cukier waniliowy, Hungarian: Vaníliás cukor, Swedish: Vaniljsocker, Macedonian: Ванилин шеќер) is a commonly used ingredient of Italian, Dutch, German, Polish, Swedish, Finnish, Danish, Austrian, Norwegian, Hungarian, Czech, Slovak, Slovenian, Croatian, Bosnian, Serbian, Turkish and other European desserts.

Vanilla sugar is made of sugar and vanilla beans, or sugar mixed with vanilla extract (in a proportion of two cups of sugar for one teaspoon of extract).

Pre-packaged vanilla sugar can be costly and difficult to obtain outside Europe but can be made at home.  Sometimes it can be replaced with vanilla extract, where one teaspoon equals one package. However, when it is needed as a topping, vanilla extract is unsuitable. 

Vanilla sugar can be prepared by combining 400 g (2 cups) of white sugar with the scraped seeds of one vanilla bean. It can also be made by adding 1 to 2 whole vanilla beans to an airtight jar with 200 to 400 g (1 to 2 cups) of white sugar, and aging the mixture for two weeks; the sugar can be replaced as it is used.

Cheaper vanilla sugar is also available, made only from sugar and vanillin.

References

External links

How to make vanilla sugar, Archived
Vanilla Beans and Vanilla Bean Powder

Sugars
Vanilla